Victor Sanders (born February 16, 1995) is an American basketball player for Anwil Włocławek of the Polish Basketball League. He competed in college for Idaho.

College career
Sanders tore his ACL in his right knee before starting college at the University of Idaho but started playing basketball three months after surgery without medical approval. He received limited minutes as a freshman, scoring four points per game. He improved his scoring average to 14 points per game as a sophomore. As a junior, Sanders averaged 20.9 points per game and became a team leader. He was selected to the First Team All-Big Sky as a junior. As a senior, Sanders was named to the Second Team All-Big Sky. He was also selected to the second-team NABC All-District 6. Sanders averaged 19 points per game as a senior and led the Vandals to a second-place finish in the Big Sky Conference. He finished second on the all-time scoring list at Idaho with 1,804 points.

Professional career
After going undrafted in the 2018 NBA draft, Sanders played two games for the Denver Nuggets in the NBA Summer League. Sanders signed his first professional contract with the Belgian squad Antwerp Giants on August 5, 2018.

On July 2, 2020, he has signed with Dolomiti Energia Trento of the Italian Lega Basket Serie A. Sanders averaged 9.8 points per game.

On July 15, 2021, he signed with Reyer Venezia. Sanders was cut from the team after driving in the wrong direction on the highway.

On August 2, 2022, he signed with CS Universitatea Cluj-Napoca of the Liga Națională.

On January 29, 2023, he signed with Anwil Włocławek of the Polish Basketball League.

References

External links
Idaho Vandals bio

1995 births
Living people
American expatriate basketball people in Belgium
American expatriate basketball people in Italy
American men's basketball players
Antwerp Giants players
Aquila Basket Trento players
Basketball players from Portland, Oregon
CS Universitatea Cluj-Napoca (men's basketball) players
Idaho Vandals men's basketball players
Jefferson High School (Portland, Oregon) alumni
Lega Basket Serie A players
Reyer Venezia players
Shooting guards